BBQ Brawl (titled BBQ Brawl: Flay V. Symon during the first season) is an American cooking competition television series that airs on Food Network.

Production

The series is filmed at the Star Hill Ranch in Austin, Texas.

The first season aired from August 1 to August 22, 2019; and it was presented by chefs Bobby Flay and Michael Symon. Chefs Moe Cason, Chris Lilly and Amy Mills served as judges. It began with eight barbecue chefs in the pilot episode, who were then divided into two teams that were each headed by Flay and Symon. At the end of each episode, one chef from each team was eliminated. The winner in the season finale was awarded the title "Master of 'Cue", which was in turn the name of their subsequent series on FoodNetwork.com.

The second season added chef and former football player Eddie Jackson as a host alongside Flay and Symon. Chefs Rodney Scott and Brooke Williamson were added in as the new judges along with television personality Carson Kressley. It aired from June 14 to August 9, 2021.

The third season consisting of eight episodes brought in chefs Jet Tila and Anne Burrell as new hosts, serving as mentors alongside Flay. It aired from May 9 to June 27, 2022.

Contestants

Season 1

Winner
 Lee Ann Whippen  – Tampa, Florida

Runner-up
 Susie Bulloch  – Lehi, Utah

Eliminated

 Joe Pearce  – Kansas City, Missouri
 Kevin Bludso  – Compton, California
 Carey Bringle  – Nashville, Tennessee
 George "Tuffy" Stone  – Richmond, Virginia
 Phil Johnson  – Phoenix, Arizona
 Lynnae Oxley-Loupe  – Battle Ground, Washington

Season 2

Season 3

Contestant progress

Season 1

  (WINNER) This contestant won the competition and was crowned "Master of 'Cue".
 (RUNNER-UP) The contestant was the runner-up in the finals of the competition.
 (BTM) The contestant was selected as one of the bottom entries on their team, but was not eliminated.
 (OUT) The contestant was eliminated from the competition.

Season 2

Season 3

Episodes

Season 1 (2019)

Season 2 (2021)

Season 3 (2022)

References

External links
 
 
 Rock Shrimp Productions  The Full-Service Production Team

2010s American cooking television series
2019 American television series debuts
Cooking competitions in the United States
English-language television shows
Food Network original programming
Food reality television series
Television series by Rock Shrimp Productions
Television shows filmed in Texas